In the United Kingdom, the term listed building refers to a building or other structure officially designated as being of special architectural, historical, or cultural significance; Grade I structures are those considered to be "buildings of exceptional interest". Listing was begun by a provision in the Town and Country Planning Act 1947. Once listed, strict limitations are imposed on the modifications allowed to a building's structure or fittings. In Wales, the authority for listing under the Planning (Listed Buildings and Conservation Areas) Act 1990 rests with Cadw.

Buildings

|}

Notes

References

See also

 Listed buildings in Wales
 Grade I listed buildings in Monmouthshire
 Grade I listed buildings in Newport
 Grade I listed buildings in Caerphilly County Borough
 Grade II* listed buildings in Blaenau Gwent – there are currently no Grade I listed buildings in Blaenau Gwent
 Grade II* listed buildings in Torfaen
Scheduled Monuments in Torfaen

External links

 
Torfaen I